Ravija Sandaruwan (born 22 June 1992) is a Sri Lankan-born cricketer who plays for the Kuwait national cricket team. He made his List A debut for Saracens Sports Club in the 2012–13 Premier Limited Overs Tournament in Sri Lanka on 27 December 2012. He made his first-class debut, also for Saracens Sports Club, in the 2012–13 Premier League Tournament on 30 March 2013.

In April 2018, he represented Kuwait in Western sub-region group of the 2018–19 ICC World Twenty20 Asia Qualifier tournament, playing in all six matches. He made his Twenty20 International (T20I) debut for Kuwait against the Maldives on 20 January 2019 in the 2019 ACC Western Region T20 tournament, and was named the player of the match. Three days later, in the match against Bahrain, he scored 103 runs from 59 balls, and was again named the player of the match. He was the leading run-scorer in the tournament, with 177 runs in four matches.

In June 2019, he was named in Kuwait's T20I squad for their series against Qatar. In October 2021, he was named in Kuwait's squad for the Group A matches in the 2021 ICC Men's T20 World Cup Asia Qualifier.

See also
 List of centuries in Twenty20 International cricket

References

External links
 

1992 births
Living people
Kuwaiti cricketers
Kuwait Twenty20 International cricketers
Saracens Sports Club cricketers
Cricketers from Colombo
Sri Lankan emigrants to Kuwait
Sri Lankan expatriate sportspeople in Kuwait